The Current Index to Statistics is an online database published by the Institute of Mathematical Statistics and the American Statistical Association that contains bibliographic data of articles in statistics, probability, and related fields. It was shut down at the end of 2019.

See also
 Web of Science
 IEEE Xplore

References

External links
 Official website

American Statistical Association
Institute of Mathematical Statistics
Bibliographic databases and indexes
Online databases